Neeritter is a village in the Dutch province of Limburg. It is located in the municipality of Leudal.

History 
The village was first mentioned in 1143 as "aliam Iteram que dicitur nova", and means "lower lying stream". 

Neeritter developed in the Early Middle Ages along the Itterbeek. In 1584, a semi circular wall was built around the village to protect against the plundering armies during the Eighty Year's War. Between 1614 and 1795, it was part of the Prince-Bishopric of Liège. In 1839, the border between Netherlands and Belgium was defined, and the Borgitter Castle ended up in Kessenich, Belgium.

The Catholic St Lambertus Church is a three aisled church which has 13th century elements. The tower was enlarged in 1842.

The Armenmolen is watermill. A watermill has been known to exist at the site since 1280. The current mill was built between 1684 and 1687. It went out of service in 1950, and is a residential home since 1972. The water wheel was replaced in 1997.

Neeritter was home to 656 people in 1840. Neeritter was a separate municipality until 1942, when it was merged with Hunsel. In 2007, it became part of the municipality of Leudal.

Gallery

References

Populated places in Limburg (Netherlands)
Former municipalities of Limburg (Netherlands)
Leudal